Shadows of Cairn is a side-scrolling platformer for DOS and Windows 3.1x where the player controls Quinn, an apprentice thief (and namesake character).

Plot 
Although Quinn is an apprentice thief, he is too honest to steal anything of value and prove himself to his guild. As such, his guild master sets him up to take the fall for the murder of the Duke of Cairn. 

After escaping from his holding cell, Quinn must fight and sneak his way through several areas of the tiered outpost city in the mountains of Cairn, prove his innocence and save the outpost from the greedy menace of his former master and associates.

Gameplay 

Similar to Prince of Persia, there are two major parts of the play in Shadows of Cairn: the player has to navigate Quinn over pits and through obstacles by running, jumping, climbing, and hiding; the player also must fight enemies to progress by using high, medium and low punches or kicks. Quinn doesn't fight automatically; the player has to put him into fight mode.

Unlike Prince of Persia, there are four difficulties. In addition to Easy, Normal, and Hard, a fourth difficulty "Very Easy" exists which allows the player to cheat their way through the game by giving them infinite hit points or even making them completely immune to being hit. There are no drawbacks to this mode aside from the possibility of getting stuck in certain traps which would otherwise immediately kill them.

The game ushers the player along by issuing waypoints directly on Quinn's compass, showing them exactly where to go to progress the story. This could be anywhere from a local tavern to a magical tower on an entirely different tier of the city. Due to this linearity, it's unlikely that the player will get lost or stuck. This game also has no inventory system, although there are chests scattered around the world that contain useful items such as medicinal herbs or quest-related items such as the Crazy Guy's Rat which progress the story or can be traded for other items such as new weaponry.

Sometimes, the player is shown an in-game animated cutscene. These cutscenes are fully voiced (using tracks from the CD-ROM) and animated: the art style differing from the cover art and the in-game sprites.

Reception
The game was poorly received by critics. PC Gamer scored it a 40%, characterizing it generally as boring, also noting intensely frustrating fighting dynamics and excessively high-difficulty mazes. The Swedish High Score magazine gave the game a 20%, specifically critiquing the game's content and playability.

Despite the negative playability aspects, however, the "high resolution" (44.1 kHz) rock soundtrack received favorable attention earning praise from reviewers such as Computer Gaming World and the Sydney Morning Herald. New Media Magazine awarded it an Invision Award Finalist for "Best Audio/Soundtrack of the Year 1995".

Reviews
 White Wolf Inphobia #55 (May 1995)

References

External links
 

DOS games
Windows games
1994 video games
Fantasy video games
Video games developed in the United States
Single-player video games
Stealth video games
Platform fighters
Side-scrolling platform games